Kudymkarsky District is an administrative district (raion) of Komi-Permyak Okrug in Perm Krai, Russia; one of the thirty-three in the krai. As a municipal division, it is incorporated as Kudymkarsky  Municipal District. It is located in the west of the krai. Its administrative center is the town of Kudymkar (which is not administratively a part of the district). Population:

Geography
Main rivers flowing through the district include the Ivna, the Kuva, and the Velva.

History
The district was established on February 27, 1924.

Administrative and municipal status
Within the framework of administrative divisions, Kudymkarsky District is one of the thirty-three in the krai. The town of Kudymkar serves as its administrative center, despite being incorporated separately as a town of krai significance—an administrative unit with the status equal to that of the districts.

As a municipal division, the district is incorporated as Kudymkarsky Municipal District. The town of krai significance of Kudymkar is incorporated separately from the district as Kudymkar Urban Okrug.

Demographics
Ethnic composition (as of the 2002 Census):
Komi-Permyak people: 85.3%
Russians: 13.9%

Economy
The economy of the district is based on forestry, timber industry, and agriculture.

See also
Zarechny Peshnigort

References

Notes

Sources

Districts of Perm Krai
Komi-Permyak Okrug
States and territories established in 1924